Adiantum reniforme (lotus-leaved maidenhair fern) is a species of fern in the genus Adiantum (maidenhairs), family Pteridaceae. It grows in sheltered rock crevices and on walls. It is native to East Africa, Madagascar, Comoros and the Madeira, Canary and Cape Verde islands.

Notes

reniforme
Flora of Africa
Flora of Madeira